The striated pardalote (Pardalotus striatus) is the least colourful and most common of the four pardalote species. Other common names include pickwick, wittachew and chip-chip. It is a very small, short-tailed bird that is more often heard than seen, foraging noisily for lerps and other small creatures in the treetops.

Taxonomy

Four full species were originally named, and are clearly recognisable in the field. They are now classified as merely well-defined subspecies instead.

 The yellow-tipped pardalote (subspecies striatus) is found mainly in Tasmania, but crosses the 200 miles of Bass Strait to the mainland each winter in a migration.
 The striated pardalote, subspecies substriatus, central and western Australia.
 The eastern striated or red-tipped pardalote, subspecies ornatus,  from the sub-tropical east coast, including the Sydney region.
 Two subspecies of the black-headed pardalote, melanocephalus and uropygialis, from north-eastern New South Wales to north-eastern Queensland, and across the Top End to the Kimberley.

All five forms have a black cap which may be striated but never spotted, a white wing stripe and a small, conspicuous wing spot—bright red in all except striatus, which has a yellow spot.

Description

The striated pardalote's plumage varies considerably across its range. The crown is black, with subspecies substriatus, striatus and ornatus having white streaks. The eyebrow is white, starting with a yellow mark near the beak. All races have a white stripe on the wing and olive backs. The nominate race has a yellow spot on the wing, whilst the other subspecies have a red dot. The male and female are similar, juveniles have duller plumage. Similar species include the spotted pardalote and the red-browed pardalote.

Distribution and habitat
Striated pardalotes occupy a vast range of habitat types from tall mountain rainforest to arid scrubland, although they favour eucalyptus forest and woodlands. They are found in all parts of Australia except some of the Western Australian deserts.

Behaviour

Feeding
Striated pardalotes feed on insects and insect larvae. They usually do so in the high foliage of eucalyptus trees, but may come closer to the ground where there are lower shrubs. Feeding takes place in small groups.

Breeding
Breeding occurs from June to February. Two to five white, oval-shaped eggs are laid in a nest is made of bark fiber, rootlets and fine grass, and placed in tree hollow, a tunnel excavated in the side of a bank or within crevices in man-made objects. Both sexes incubate and care for the young.

Call
Call is a clear, sharp, musical witta-witta, the second part slightly lower, repeated regularly in intervals for long periods; striated pardalotes also give off soft, low trills.

References

Gallery

External links
 Striated pardalote videos, photos & sounds on the Internet Bird Collection.

striated pardalote
Endemic birds of Australia
Birds of Victoria (Australia)
striated pardalote
striated pardalote
Articles containing video clips